47 Tauri (abbreviated to 47 Tau) is a binary star in the zodiac constellation of Taurus. Parallax measurements made by the Hipparcos spacecraft put it at a distance of about 330 light-years (102 parsecs) from Earth. The system has a combined apparent magnitude of about 4.89, meaning it can be faintly seen with the naked eye, according to the Bortle scale.

47 Tauri is a visual binary, meaning that the two components can be resolved, and the orbit is derived from the positions of the two stars. The primary component is a G-type giant. Its radius is about 13 times that of the Sun. The companion is likely a white-colored A-type main-sequence star that is fainter. The two stars are separated about 1.3 arcseconds away, and because of their large separation, the two stars take some 479 years to complete an orbit.

References

G-type giants
A-type main-sequence stars
Binary stars
Taurus (constellation)
Tauri, 047
Durchmusterung objects
026722
019740
1311